The Consolidation Act was an act of the parliament of Great Britain passed in 1749 to reorganize the Royal Navy.

See also
 Act of Parliament
 Destination Tables

History of the Royal Navy
1749 in military history
Great Britain Acts of Parliament 1749